Welwyn Garden City Hockey Club are a field hockey club based in Hatfield, Hertfordshire, England. They were established in 1921. The club train and play on the astroturf pitch at the University of Hertfordshire's De Havilland Sport Village.

Club
The club have eight adults teams, all playing in the East Hockey League system. The club have also a very strong junior section called Welwyn Wasps. The club's main ambitions are to win leagues, develop players to their full potential, and also to let the players enjoy themselves when they train or play.

Welwyn Garden City's current kit suppliers are Dita Field Hockey and they are currently without a shirt sponsor this season, they were sponsored by agency Key People before the 2009–2010 season.

Men's teams

Season 2009–10
 WGC Men's 1st XI: East League Division 3SW
 WGC Men's 2nd XI: East League Division 5SW
 WGC Men's 3rd XI: East League Division 6SW
 WGC Men's 4th XI: East League Division 7SW

Ladies' teams 
 WGC Ladies' 1st XI East Women's League Division 2SW
 WGC Ladies' 2nd XI Five Counties League Division 2
 WGC Ladies' 3rd XI Five Counties League Division 3
 WGC Ladies' 4th XI Five Counties League Division 5

References

External links
 
 

English field hockey clubs
Field hockey clubs established in 1921
1921 establishments in England